The 1937 Rose Bowl,  was the 23rd edition of the bowl game, between the independent Pittsburgh Panthers of western Pennsylvania and the Washington Huskies of Seattle, the champions of the Pacific Coast Conference. The game was played at the Rose Bowl in Pasadena, California, on Friday, January 1, 1937.

Ahead of the game, seating in the Rose Bowl was expanded to 87,677. This was Pittsburgh's fourth Rose Bowl in nine years, with losses in the 1928, 1930, and 1933 editions. Washington had previously tied in 1924 and lost in 1926.

In the final AP poll released in late November, Pittsburgh was third and Washington was fifth.

Pittsburgh led 7–0 at the half and scored two more touchdowns for a  shutout and their first

Scoring

First quarter
Pittsburgh – Frank Patrick, 1-yard run (Bill Daddio kick)

Third quarter
Pittsburgh – Frank Patrick, 3-yard run (Bill Daddio kick)

Fourth quarter
Pittsburgh – Bill Daddio, 71-yard interception (Bill Daddio kick)

Game notes
 The game program was 25 cents.

References

Rose Bowl
Rose Bowl Game
Pittsburgh Panthers football bowl games
Washington Huskies football bowl games
1937 in sports in California
January 1937 sports events